Don Samuels (born 1948/1949) is an American politician and activist, who served as a member of the Minneapolis City Council from 2003 to 2014. A member of the Democratic Party, Samuels came to national attention as a candidate for the DFL nomination for Minnesota's 5th congressional district, for which he placed an unexpectedly close second to incumbent Ilhan Omar in the 2022 primary.

Career

Minneapolis City Council (2003–2014) 
Samuels was elected to represent Ward 3 on the Minneapolis City Council in a special election in 2003, completing the final three years of Joe Biernat's term. Samuels defeated the DFL-endorsed candidate and was sworn in on February 14, 2003. A 2005 redistricting led to Samuels' home becoming part of the city's Ward 5.

In 2007, Samuels declared, "I've said burn North High School down!", referring to North Community High School. His comments drew criticism from Nick Coleman and others. Samuels argued his comments were trying to raise issues about under-education of black youth by Minneapolis Public Schools.

Samuels briefly campaigned for Hennepin County commissioner in 2012. Samuels supported public financing for the new Minnesota Vikings stadium, U.S. Bank Stadium.

When Samuels ran for mayor in 2013 as a Democrat he drew donations and support from several Republican politicians despite there still being an endorsed Republican candidate for mayor. Samuels did not run for reelection as city council member, so he could run for mayor. In the election Samuels performed strongest in his north Minneapolis Ward 5 where he outpolled all other candidates including eventual winner Betsy Hodges. Samuels's term ended January 6, 2014, when his successor Blong Yang was sworn into office.

Post-Council political career 
Samuels was elected to serve Minneapolis Public Schools school board in 2014 as an at-large representative. He served for one term, from January 13, 2015, until January 15, 2019. While he was campaigning for school board, Samuels called the police on a hot dog giveaway led by Neighborhoods Organizing for Change which was conducting a get out the vote event.

Samuels was among several Minneapolis residents who sued the Minneapolis City Council and mayor, Jacob Frey, in 2020, alleging they did not hire enough police officers as required by city charter. In 2021, a public safety charter amendment was presented to Minneapolis voters. Samuels was active in the successful campaign to defeat the amendment.

2022 congressional campaign 
Samuels launched a DFL primary challenge for Minnesota's 5th congressional district against Ilhan Omar in March 2022. Samuels was endorsed by former Chief of the Minneapolis Police Department, Medaria Arradondo. According to campaign finance records, Samuels outraised Omar in the second quarter of 2022.  Samuels was defeated by Omar in the primary on August 9, 2022.

Personal life
Samuels was born and raised in Kingston, Jamaica. He immigrated to the United States at the age of 20 to attend the Pratt Institute in New York City, where he earned a bachelor’s degree in Industrial Design. Samuels later went on to earn a Master of Divinity at Luther Seminary in St. Paul, Minn. Prior to being involved in politics, Samuels worked as a toy designer for such iconic brands as Hasbro, Playskoool, and Milton Bradley. 

Today, Samuels lives in north Minneapolis with his wife, Sondra Hollinger Samuels. In 2020, the couple took a group of neighborhood children to Boom Island Park on a routine bike ride. While at the park, the kids waded into the water and one child was swept away and drowned. After Samuels was criticized for his role in the incident on social media, he tweeted "can't swim, but can govern,” which he later deleted and publicly apologized for.

References

External links 

20th-century African-American people
21st-century African-American politicians
21st-century American politicians
African-American city council members in Minnesota
Candidates in the 2022 United States House of Representatives elections
Jamaican emigrants to the United States
Living people
Minneapolis City Council members
Politicians from Minneapolis
Pratt Institute alumni
Luther Seminary alumni
Minnesota Democrats
Year of birth missing (living people)
1940s births